Federal Route 94, or Jalan Kulai-Kota Tinggi, is the main federal road in Johor, Malaysia. It connects Kulai to Kota Tinggi.

Route background
The Kilometre Zero of the Federal Route 94 is located at Kulai, at its interchange with the Federal Route 1, the main trunk road of the central of Peninsular Malaysia.

Features

At most sections, the Federal Route 94 was built under the JKR R5 road standard, allowing maximum speed limit of up to 90 km/h.

List of junctions and towns

References

094